Bhakta Cheta is a 1961 Indian Kannada language film directed by M. B. Ganesh. The film stars Rajkumar, Pratima Devi and Indira.

Cast
 Rajkumar
 Prathima Devi
 Indira
 Balakrishna
 H. R. Shastry
 Dikki Madhava Rao

References

External links
 
 Bhakta Cheta on Youtube

1961 films
1960s Kannada-language films